The Ancient Economy is a book about the economic system of classical antiquity written by the classicist Moses I. Finley. It was originally published in 1973. Finley interprets the economy from 1000 BC to 500 AD sociologically, instead of using economic models (like for example Michael Rostovtzeff). Finley attempted to prove that the ancient economy was largely a byproduct of status. In other words, economic systems were not interdependent, they were embedded in status positions. The analysis owes some debt to sociologists such as Max Weber and Karl Polanyi.

Summary
Finley represented the side of the "primitivists" where he argued that the economies of Ancient Greece and Rome differed wildly from how the economies of the Western world function today. The modernists, on the contrary, believed that the ancient economy resembles in many ways the way it functions in modern Western democratic states, where economic laws such as supply and demand functioned in the same ways then as it does now. To show how the economies of Ancient Greece and Rome differed from our times, he first examines how the Ancients lacked even the concept of an "economy" in the way we refer to it in our own times. Economy derives from a Greek word, οἰκονόμος, "one who manages a household". The household was the most important economic unit. Of course, they mined, taxed, and traded, but what the Ancients did not do was to combine all their commercial activities into an overarching sub-system of society, a giant marketplace where the means of production and distribution responded to market forces such as the cost of labour, supply and demand, trade routes, etc. Moreover, Finley takes the fact that the Ancient Greeks and Romans did not have a sophisticated accounting system as well as how imprecise or carefree they are about numerical data to imply the lack of an economy resembling Western modern ones that place exorbitant demands on numerical computations and precise accounting records.

He also deals with the roles of orders and status. He argues that because the ancients placed so much emphasis on status, which heavily regulated what commercial activities was acceptable for those in the upper orders and well as the lower ones, their economy differed from any modern economy where everyone was free and able to participate in whatever legal commercial enterprise. Finley also discusses the institution of slavery which was very prominent in the Ancient world. The relationship between master and slave was complex and even among slaves, there was a diversity of societal rankings. Yet despite this complexity, Finley shows how slavery provided free labour that at times had to be curtailed in order to provide work for the native artisans. Slavery heavily influenced the value placed on labour and certain jobs. Thus, the distribution of labour as well as the means of production that one sees in the ancient economy was different from how modern economies function where human capital plays a role in determinant of price as well as on supply.

Another relationship Finley discusses is the way the Ancients viewed the value of land. The ownership of a piece of land for the Ancient Greeks and Romans was not seen as a capital investment where profits could be obtained from the growing and selling of crops, but used as showpieces to enhance one's status as well as something that was inherently desirable from a traditional stand-point where economics played no part. To illustrate this, Finley turns to one of Pliny's letters where he writes that he will have to borrow money to buy more land. In the letter, Pliny does not discuss if this new purchase is an economically wise one in terms of the profits that can be derived from it. The last part of the book, Finley discusses the discrepancies between life in the urban and rural settings. He also writes about how government forces did not play a role in managing the economy and treasury in the same ways modern governments are expected to do in most Western economies.

Reception
The book has had such an impact on classical scholarship that the views brought forward in The Ancient Economy has been labeled "the Finley/Polanyi orthodoxy" Finley covers both ancient economic thought, wealth, the role of a government, the use of slavery, and the tax system. "Indeed, no individual writer (...) has attempted a comprehensive economic overview of the entire classical world since Finley, though period specific, regional or thematic work has abounded."

Notes

Further reading
 Morris, Ian. "The Athenian Economy Twenty Years After The Ancient Economy", Classical Philology, Vol. 89. (1994), pp. 351–366.
 Morris, Ian. "Foreword [to the updated edition]", The Ancient Economy by Moses I. Finley. Berkeley; Los Angeles; London: University of California Press, 1999 (paperback), pp. ix–xxxvi.
 Derks, Hans, The "Ancient Economy": the problem and the fraud, in: The European Legacy, 7:5 (2002), p. 597-620.

Books about economic history
University of California Press books
1973 non-fiction books